Samuel Ofori (born 23 January 1996) is a Ghanaian professional footballer who plays as a forward for  club Safa.

Career 
Ofori previously played for Berekum Chelsea and Medeama SC. In January 2021, he was sent on a season-long loan deal to Western Region-based club Karela United. He played 5 league matches and scored 1 goal in the 2019–20 Ghana Premier League season before the league was put on hold and later cancelled due to the COVID-19 pandemic. He featured for Karela during the first round of the 2020–21 Ghana Premier League. On 15 November 2020, he scored a goal in a 2–2 draw against Ashanti Gold with Diawisie Taylor scoring the other goal.

Ofori joined Lebanese Premier League side Safa in August 2022.

Honours
Safa
 Lebanese Challenge Cup runner-up: 2022

References

External links 
 

Living people
1996 births
Ghanaian footballers
Association football forwards
Berekum Chelsea F.C. players
Medeama SC players
Karela United FC players
Safa SC players
Ghana Premier League players

Ghanaian expatriate footballers
Ghanaian expatriate sportspeople in Lebanon
Expatriate footballers in Lebanon